David Bermudo Rubio (born 14 January 1979) is a Spanish former footballer who played as a left back.

Club career
Born in Santa Coloma de Gramenet, Barcelona, Catalonia, Bermudo unsuccessfully emerged through local giants FC Barcelona's youth system at La Masia, leaving in 2001 and signing with CD Tenerife, freshly returned to La Liga. He made his debut in the competition on 26 August 2001 in a 0–2 home loss against Deportivo Alavés, and would total a mere 12 appearances during the season, being booked four times in an eventual relegation back.

Subsequently, Bermudo resumed his career in the second division, representing in the following five years Algeciras CF (loaned), Tenerife and UD Almería. He achieved another top flight promotion with the latter club, but only appeared in five matches during the campaign.

In the summer of 2007, Bermudo signed with Pontevedra CF in the third level, moving to CE Sabadell FC two years later.

Honours
Spain U20
FIFA World Youth Championship: 1999

References

External links

1979 births
Living people
People from Santa Coloma de Gramenet
Sportspeople from the Province of Barcelona
Spanish footballers
Footballers from Catalonia
Association football defenders
La Liga players
Segunda División players
Segunda División B players
Tercera División players
FC Barcelona C players
FC Barcelona Atlètic players
FC Barcelona players
CD Tenerife players
Algeciras CF footballers
UD Almería players
Pontevedra CF footballers
CE Sabadell FC footballers
CF Badalona players
Spain youth international footballers
Spain under-21 international footballers